Goodness Ohiremen Ajayi (born 6 October 1994) is a Nigerian professional footballer who plays as a forward for Croatian club Opatija.

Career
Born in Benin City, Ajayi was one of several players who moved from the Nigerian Abuja Football College Academy to the Rijeka youth team in late 2012, impressing enough to stay at the club. He made his Rijeka debut in the first round of the 2013–14 season at the age of 18, becoming the first player from Abuja Academy, run by Gabriele Volpi, the owner of Rijeka and Spezia Calcio, to feature in the club's squad.

While at Rijeka, Ajayi was loaned to Bosnian Premier League club Široki Brijeg in July 2015 and to Israeli Premier League club Hapoel Ashkelon in August 2017. In June 2018, he was transferred to Inter Zaprešić as part of a player-exchange deal. On 19 June 2019, he signed a contract with Romanian Liga I club Astra Giurgiu.

Honours
Rijeka
1. HNL: 2016–17
Croatian Cup: 2013–14, 2016–17
Croatian Super Cup: 2014

References

External links
 

1994 births
Living people
Sportspeople from Benin City
Association football forwards
Nigerian footballers
HNK Rijeka players
HNK Rijeka II players
NK Široki Brijeg players
Hapoel Ashkelon F.C. players
NK Inter Zaprešić players
FC Astra Giurgiu players
Kazma SC players
NK Opatija players
Croatian Football League players
Premier League of Bosnia and Herzegovina players
Israeli Premier League players
Liga I players
Kuwait Premier League players
Second Football League (Croatia) players
Nigerian expatriate footballers
Expatriate footballers in Croatia
Expatriate footballers in Bosnia and Herzegovina
Expatriate footballers in Israel
Expatriate footballers in Romania
Expatriate footballers in Kuwait
Nigerian expatriate sportspeople in Croatia
Nigerian expatriate sportspeople in Bosnia and Herzegovina
Nigerian expatriate sportspeople in Israel
Nigerian expatriate sportspeople in Romania
Nigerian expatriate sportspeople in Kuwait